MacDonnell Road (formerly ) is a street in the Mid-Levels area of Hong Kong Island, Hong Kong.

MacDonnell Road is one of the most expensive roads in Central Mid-Levels, together with Old Peak Road, Magazine Gap Road, Tregunter Path, Bowen Road, Borrett Road and May Road.

Location
Starting from Garden Road, the road runs westward in the Mid-Levels and ends in Kennedy Road.

Name
MacDonnell Road is named after former Hong Kong Governor Richard Graves MacDonnell, who was in office from 1866 to 1872. MacDonnell developed Victoria Peak during his tenure.

Several streets in Kowloon, built in the second half of the 19th century, were given names that were duplicates of street names on Hong Kong Island. To avoid confusion, their names were changed in 1909, and MacDonnell Road on Kowloon was then renamed Canton Road.

The 1904 book English Made Easy by Mok Man Cheung was published in Hong Kong and listed MacDonnell Road as 'Mac Donald Road'.

The Chinese name of McDonald's, is the same as the Chinese name of MacDonnell Road, with  meaning 'Road'. The first McDonald's restaurant was opened in Hong Kong in January 1975, and the name was chosen because it represented a 'well-known local street'.

History
Construction of MacDonnell Road started in 1891 and its first section was completed in 1892. The Road was extended eastward in 1899, then forming a junction with Bowen Road in its eastern end.

Crown land lots at MacDonnell Road were let by public auction for 999-year leases as early as 1896. The colonial government ceased offering such long leases after May 1898, and only a limited number of plots on Hong Kong Island and in Kowloon have a lease term of 999 years.

In 1903, parts of MacDonnell Road were infested with anopheles, and malaria was rife there. Nullahs in the area were cleared as a preventive measure.

Before World War II, the area below Victoria Peak was home to people from a number of ethnic backgrounds. Wealthy Japanese were living as high up as MacDonnell Road.

During the Battle of Hong Kong in December 1941, the headquarters of the 2/14th Battalion, Punjab Regiment was located on MacDonnell Road. The 2/14 Punjab were part of the West Brigade, and their tactical area of responsibility stretched along the northwestern shore of Hong Kong Island from Causeway Bay to Belcher's Point, including the defense of the Governor's House and of Major General Maltby's headquarters.

Features
Features along the road include:
 No. 1: YWCA Hong Kong headquarters
 No. 2: St. John Tower, which houses the headquarters of Hong Kong St. John Ambulance. The building also houses Two MacDonnell Road, which features serviced apartments.
 MacDonnell Road Bridge. MacDonnell Road crosses the tracks of the Peak Tram at MacDonnell Road Bridge, near MacDonnell Road stop. An existing bridge was demolished and rebuilt in reinforced concrete, supported on granite columns, in 1938.
 No. 31: Hong Kong Branch of the First Church of Christ, Scientist. Built in 1912, this building is the only branch of this religious denomination in Hong Kong. An annex was added in 1956. The church is listed as a Grade II historic building.
 No. 33: St. Paul's Co-educational College. Founded in 1915 as St. Paul's Girls' College, the College was relocated in 1927 to its current location at No. 33 MacDonnell Road, which was granted by the Government in 1924. It has been the site of the school since then. The school became Hong Kong's first co-educational school in 1945. The 1927 school building is a Grade II historic building.
 No. 75: Office of the Commissioner of The Ministry of Foreign Affairs of The People's Republic of China in Hong Kong (the address is No. 42 Kennedy Road and No. 75 MacDonnell Road)

Notable residents
 Stanley Ho (1921-2020), Hong Kong-Macau billionaire businessman. Ho grew up in a two-house residence on MacDonnell Road, "with two gardens that ran for half a mile".
 Lee Shau-kee (born 1928), Hong Kong business magnate. Lee and his family lived in the penthouse at Eva Court at 36 MacDonnell Road from 1984 to the 2010s. The 22-storey residential building had been developed for the Lee family and was named after Lee Shau-kee's ex-wife, Lau Wai-ken. In 2010, Lee spent HK$1.82 billion for a plot of land on The Peak to build his new home. The newly acquired plot was the most expensive residential site in the world at the time on a per square foot basis.
 Kenny Bee (born 1953), Hong Kong singer, musician and actor. He released an autobiography in December 2007, titled  (MacDonnell Road), named after the street he grew up on.

Cited buildings
Several buildings along MacDonnell Road have been cited in books and research articles. They include:

 Cases involving several buildings along MacDonnell Road have contributed to the clarification of the legal definition of "immediate neighborhood " in Hong Kong. They include the No. 3 MacDonnell Road Case and Nos. 16-18 MacDonnell Road Case.
 E.H. Ray, Joyce Symons' granduncle lived at MacDonnell Road before World War II. His house was commandeered by the military during the Battle of Hong Kong.
 No. 6. Noel Croucher bought and redeveloped the property at No. 6 MacDonnell Road in the 1950s and he owned it for many years.

Conservation
The western half of MacDonnell Road is part of the Central Route of the Central and Western Heritage Trail of the Hong Kong Tourist Association. The Route includes the First Church of Christ Scientist Hong Kong and St. Paul's Co-educational College.

Transportation
The Peak Tram meets the road near the St. Paul's Co-educational College.

Other than the Peak Tram (MacDonnell Road stop), MacDonnell Road can be reached by Citybus route 12A running from Admiralty, and the Public light bus route 1A running from Star Ferry in Central.

See also
 List of streets and roads in Hong Kong

References

External links

Google Maps of MacDonnell Road
 Gwulo.com entries:    

Mid-Levels
Roads on Hong Kong Island